Delyaliz Rosario Ambert (born 16 July 1992) is a Puerto Rican footballer who plays as a center back for the Puerto Rico women's national team.

Early life
Rosario was raised in San Juan.

International career
Rosario capped for Puerto Rico at senior level during the 2016 CONCACAF Women's Olympic Qualifying Championship.

References

External links

1992 births
Living people
Women's association football central defenders
Puerto Rican women's footballers
Sportspeople from San Juan, Puerto Rico
Puerto Rico women's international footballers
College women's soccer players in the United States
Aurora University alumni
Puerto Rican expatriate women's footballers
Puerto Rican expatriate sportspeople in Colombia
Expatriate women's footballers in Colombia